Yahia Belaskri (born 1952) is an Algerian journalist, novelist and short story writer. He is the author of four novels and the recipient of two literary prizes.

Early life
Yahia Belaskri was born in 1952.

Career
Belaskri began working as a journalist for Radio France Internationale in 2004.

Belaskri is the author of four novels. His second novel, Si tu cherches la pluie, elle vient d’en haut, is about the Algerian Civil War of the 1990s. His third novel, Une longue nuit d’absence, is about pro-republican Spaniards who emigrated to Algeria in 1939. His fourth novel, Les fils du jour, is based on the immediate aftermath of the French conquest of Algeria of 1830-1847.

Belasski won the prix Ouest-France - Etonnants voyageurs at the 2011 Étonnants voyageurs book festival in Saint-Malo for Si tu cherches la pluie, elle vient d’en haut. In 2015, he won the Prix littéraire Beur FM Méditerranée from Beur FM for Les fils du jour.

Works

Novels

Short stories

Non-fiction

References

Living people
1952 births
People from Oran
Algerian journalists
Algerian novelists
Algerian male short story writers
Algerian book editors
21st-century Algerian people